Lola Bessis (born 30 November 1992) is a French actress, screenwriter and director. She is known for the movie Swim Little Fish Swim, in which she acted and wrote the script.

Career
She started her career at the age of 12.

In 2013, she played the lead in Swim Little Fish Swim, an English-speaking comedy-drama shot in New York and that Bessis co-directed with Ruben Amar. Critics praised Bessis' performance for her screen presence and charm.

In 2014, she was a jury member at the Deauville American Film Festival along with Clemence Poesy, Christine and The Queens and Freddie Highmore.

In 2015, she played a recurring character in the comic French TV series France Kbek. That same year she played the lead in the music video Pas là by French singer Vianney directed by Nicolas Bary. The video counts nearly 18 million views on YouTube.

In 2016 she starred in Nicolas Bedos' feature film Monsieur et Madame Adelman. That same year, Bessis starred in Mathias Malzieu's last film, Le distributeur d'aurores boréales, that has been shown at Cannes film festival 2016. In July 2016, Bessis was featured in Interview Magazine’s portfolio "Hollywood’s most wanted" among the top 15 up and coming Hollywood actors. In 2016, she was a jury member at the Les Arcs European Film Festival.

She starred in Thirst Street by Nathan Silver alongside Anjelica Huston, Lindsay Burdge, Damien Bonnard, Esther Garrel, Jacques Nolot, Françoise Lebrun. Thirst Street premiered in US Narrative competition at the 2017 Tribeca Film Festival.

In February 2017, Bessis was cast in the Picnic at Hanging Rock reboot alongside Game of Thrones actress Natalie Dormer and Orange is the New Black star Yael Stone.

References

External links 

Living people
1992 births
French film actresses
French television actresses
Film directors from Paris
21st-century French actresses
French women film directors
French women screenwriters
French screenwriters
French-language film directors